Taman Melati is a Malay majority township in Wangsa Maju, Kuala Lumpur, Malaysia. It is located between Gombak, Klang Gates, Wangsa Maju city centre and Taman Melawati. The  Kelana Jaya Line's  Taman Melati LRT station is situated in this area.

The property was developed in 1990s. The community includes many senior government servants, retired or otherwise, Many are at the peak of their careers, with Datok or Tan Sri titles.

Location 
Taman Melati is located in the Wangsa Maju parliamentary constituency and the Wangsa Maju Administrative Division of Kuala Lumpur. The current representative for Wangsa Maju is Tan Yee Kew from PKR. The administration is managed by Dewan Bandaraya Kuala Lumpur.

Demographics 
Taman Melati is located in the Wangsa Maju parliamentary constituency. The current voter composition of the constituency is 61% Malay, 31% Chinese, 8% Indian and 2% Others. The ethnic composition of Kuala Lumpur as per the 2010 Census is 45.9% Malay (including other bumiputras), 43.2% Chinese, 10.3% Indian and 0.6% Others. The religion in Kuala Lumpur as per the 2010 Census is 46.4% Islam, 35.7% Buddhism, 8.5% Hinduism, 5.8% Christianity, 1.4% Unknown/None, 1.1% Chinese Ethnic Religion, 0.6% Others and 0.5% No religion.

Entertainment 

Taman Melati has its own shopping mall called M3 Mall located opposite Taman Melati flats on Jalan Madrasah. The mall has its own  shopping outlets and restaurants and KL East Mall (Finished in 2020) located in 823, Jln Lingkaran Tengah 2, KL Timur, 53100 Kuala Lumpur.THere are also malls that are located near Taman Melati like Melawati Mall,Setapak Central and more.

Melati Utama consists of a stretch of shops and restaurants just beside the MRR2 Highway. It was developed following the establishment of Platinum Condominium.

Education 
SK Taman Melati
Sekolah Rendah Agama al-Falahiah
SMK Taman Melati
Tunku Abdul Rahman University College (located near Taman Melati)
International Islamic University Malaysia (located 5km from Taman Melati)
Sekolah Rendah Agama Salehuddin Al-Ayyubi

Religious sites 
Masjid Salehuddin al-Ayyubi
Surau Taman Melati
Surau Al Fallah, Putra Villa
Sri Ayyanareeswarar Temple (located near Taman Melati along Jalan Genting Klang)

References 
 https://web.archive.org/web/20150301154300/http://www.statistics.gov.my/portal/download_Population/files/census2010/Taburan_Penduduk_dan_Ciri-ciri_Asas_Demografi.pdf
 http://www.federalgazette.agc.gov.my/outputp/pub_20160429_P.U.(B)197.pdf

External links 
 http://m3mall.com.my
 https://pibgsmktm.weebly.com/
 http://sktmskl.blogspot.com/
 http://www.parlimen.gov.my/ahli-dewan.html?uweb=dr&

Suburbs in Kuala Lumpur